Kentucky Route 289 runs between US 68 in Campbellsville, Kentucky in Taylor County to  US 68 about 3 miles south of Lebanon, Kentucky in Marion County. It is the old route for US 68 going into rural communities, such as Hobson and Finley in Taylor County and Jessietown and New Market, Kentucky in Marion County.

The route is 15.066 miles long and is in some cases more expedient in going between Lebanon and Campbellsville than the scenic highway Route 68.

An earlier KY 289 was a road from Golden Pond northward to Eddyville. In 1964/1965, most of the road was inundated due to formation of Lake Barkley. A small portion remained north from Golden Pond but that was decommissioned the next year, and it is now Forest Road 134.

Route description
KY 289 begins at an intersection with US 68/KY 55 in Campbellsville, Taylor County, heading north on two-lane undivided Lebanon Avenue. The road passes a few businesses before it enters residential areas. The route becomes Old Lebanon Road and passes through more areas of homes and businesses, where it runs to the west of a lake. KY 289 passes to the west of Taylor Regional Hospital as it continues through developed areas and crosses KY 3350. The road leaves Campbellsville and heads into farmland with some residential development, curving northwest and intersecting the eastern terminus of KY 3211. The route continues through a mix of farms and woods with some homes, turning to the north at an intersection with KY 1400. KY 289 runs through more rural areas and comes to an intersection with KY 744. At this point, the route forms a concurrency with KY 744 before KY 744 splits to the west. KY 289 curves to the northeast and reaches a junction with the northern terminus of KY 634.

At the KY 634 intersection, the road crosses into Marion County and becomes unnamed, heading into dense forests. The route makes several curves before it continues to the north. KY 289 continues into farmland with some woods and homes and forms a short concurrency with KY 412. The road turns east before curving to the northeast as it heads through more rural areas. KY 289 continues north and comes to its northern terminus at another intersection with US 68/KY 55 south of Lebanon.

Major intersections

References

0289
Transportation in Taylor County, Kentucky
Transportation in Marion County, Kentucky
Campbellsville, Kentucky